Maxwell Wilkinson Oldmeadow  (3 August 192421 March 2013) was an Australian politician.

Born in Melbourne, he attended the University of Melbourne and then Melbourne Teachers' College. He served in the military during World War II, 1942–45. He was then a teacher and part-time lecturer at Monash University, and was elected to Dandenong City Council. In 1972, he was elected to the Australian House of Representatives as the Labor member for Holt, where he remained until 1975, when he was defeated.

References

Australian Labor Party members of the Parliament of Australia
Members of the Australian House of Representatives for Holt
Members of the Australian House of Representatives
Recipients of the Medal of the Order of Australia
1924 births
2013 deaths
20th-century Australian politicians